Monalonion is a genus of bugs in the family Miridae and tribe Dicyphini (subtribe Monaloniina).

Species are mostly distributed in Central and South America, where some including M. bondari, have minor pest status: causing damage similar to Helopeltis spp. in SE Asian cacao.

Species
The Global Biodiversity Information Facility lists:
 Monalonion annulipes V.Signoret, 1858
 Monalonion atratum Distant, 1883
 Monalonion bahiense Costa Lima, 1938
 Monalonion bicolor Carvalho & Costa, 1988
 Monalonion bondari Costa Lima, 1938
 Monalonion columbiensis Carvalho, 1984
 Monalonion decoratum Monte, 1942
 Monalonion dissimulatum Distant, 1883
 Monalonion flavisignatum Knight
 Monalonion incaicus Carvalho, 1972
 Monalonion itabunensis Carvalho, 1972
 Monalonion paraensis Carvalho, 1985
 Monalonion parviventre Herrich-Schaeffer, 1850
 Monalonion peruvianus Kirkaldy, 1907
 Monalonion schaefferi Stal, 1860
 Monalonion velezangeli Carvalho & Costa, 1988
 Monalonion versicolor Distant, 1883

References

External links
 
 

Miridae genera